Aguas Zarcas is a district of the San Carlos canton, in the Alajuela province of Costa Rica.

Toponymy
The name of Aguas Zarcas, comes from the hot spring waters that could well be called "Aguas de azul suave".

History 
From 1800, Germans, Italians and Spaniards formed the ancestors of Aguas Zarcas, the same ones that founded the Spanish colony.

Its colonizers were in charge of carrying out bites in the mountain to facilitate the arrival to the inhabitants that came from Villa Quesada looking for a place where to live.

Geography 
Aguas Zarcas has an area of  km² making it the eighth district of the canton by area and an elevation of  metres. 

It is located at an elevation range of 100 to 2100 meters above sea level.

This great variation of altitude is due to the fact that in the South of the district are the mountain foothills of the Central Mountain Range, whereas in a northerly direction, the territory follows a clear descent towards the plains of San Carlos.

It is located in the northern region of the country. It borders the districts of Cutris to the north, La Palmera to the west, Pital and Venice to the east. While to the south it borders with the canton of Sarchí.

Its head, the city of Aguas Zarcas, from where it has an excellent view of the hills of the Juan Castro Blanco National Park, is located 16.6 km (30 minutes) NE of Quesada, and 88.4 km (2 hours 20 minutes) to the NW of San José the capital of the nation.

Demographics 

For the 2011 census, Aguas Zarcas had a population of  inhabitants making it the second most populated district in the canton.

Transportation

Road transportation 
The district is covered by the following road routes:
 National Route 4
 National Route 140
 National Route 250
 National Route 747
 National Route 749
 National Route 750
 National Route 751

Locations
The 17 population centers of the district are:
 Aguas Zarcas (head of the district)
 Altamira
 Caño Negro
 Cerro Cortés
 Concepción
 Coope-San Juan
 Esquipulas
 Garabito
 La Caporal
 La Gloria
 Los Chiles
 Los Lotes
 Los Angeles (Las Delicias)
 Montecristo
 Pitalito
 Santa Fe
 San Jose

Art and sport 

The district is home to one of the country's Civic Centers, which are special sports and recreational areas, promoted by the government and supported by private entities, to promote citizen coexistence through art and sport.

Culture 

Every year there are popular festivals in the community, where there are mechanical games and bullfights. Also must be mentioned a kind of horse riding call El Tope, in which the riders wear their best clothes on their colorful horses.

Economy 

Poultry has an important presence, with chicken farms distributed throughout the district.

Local crops of cassava and pineapple (along with citrus production from other districts) focused on exports form the basis of the local agroindustry, represented by processing plants and packing of tropical fruits and tubers.
 
In the city of Aguas Zarcas, there are health, educational, financial, legal, lodging, post, car repair and construction services. Entertainment services are also offered with synthetic courts, gyms, swimming pools and nightlife venues.
 
In terms of trade, the sale of fast foods, groceries, shoes, clothes, appliances and accessories in general stands out. Also vegetables, chicken meats and milk produced locally are brought to the center to be sold at different points of sale.

Striking sites 

1-The central square has a historical Catholic church. Although, earthquakes have destroyed much of the original Spanish architecture in Alajuela, this beautiful temple still stands. With an old construction style, it is undoubtedly the most representative symbol of the community. It rises impeccably in the center of the town, dominating the urban landscape and being observable from many points of the city.

2-Within the limits of the district, there are hot springs, the biggest tourist attraction in the surroundings (shares the deposits with the neighboring district of La Palmera). These sources of heated mineral water are not related to volcanism, but to the depth of where the waters flow, along tectonic faults.

References 

Districts of Alajuela Province
Populated places in Alajuela Province